Worcester Preparatory School is an independent coeducational preparatory school in Berlin, Worcester County, Maryland in the United States. The school is divided into a preschool and kindergarten, serving approximately 50 students, a lower school, serving approximately 240 students in grades one to six, and a middle/upper school, serving approximately 320 students in grades seven to twelve.

WPS is a member of the National Association of Independent Schools and the Middle States Association of Colleges and Schools, and is both a charter member of, and the first independent school in Maryland to be accredited by, the Middle States Commission on Elementary Schools.

History
Founded in 1970 as the Worcester Country School, its name was later changed to Worcester Preparatory School.  The school  has always been coeducational.

Campus
Worcester Preparatory School's  campus is located on the southern edge of the town of Berlin, and comprises the Nichols Early Learning Center, Burbage Center for Admissions and Development, the Academic and Technology Building, the Guerrieri Library (whose design was inspired by Thomas Jefferson's Monticello), the Athletic and Performing Arts Center, and Thompson Field House.  The campus also includes tennis courts and five athletic fields.

Athletics
Sports and other activities include basketball, cross country, field hockey, dance, soccer, tennis, golf, volleyball, cheerleading, and lacrosse.

Headmasters of Worcester Preparatory School
 Franklin H. Lynch
 Barry Tull, Ed.D.
 Randal Brown
 Mike Grosso, Acting Head of School 
 John McDonald, Ed.D

References

External links 
 

Berlin, Maryland
Educational institutions established in 1970
Private high schools in Maryland
Schools in Worcester County, Maryland
Preparatory schools in Maryland
Private middle schools in Maryland
Private elementary schools in Maryland
1970 establishments in Maryland